Benoît Cosnefroy (born 17 October 1995 in Cherbourg) is a French cyclist, who currently rides for UCI WorldTeam . In July 2019, he was named in the startlist for the 2019 Tour de France. In the 2020 Tour de France, he led the mountains classification and wore the polka dot jersey for 15 consecutive stages; he ultimately finished sixth in the final classification standings.

Major results

2016
 4th Road race, UEC European Under-23 Road Championships
 5th Tour de Berne
 6th Overall Rhône-Alpes Isère Tour
2017
 1st  Road race, UCI Road World Under-23 Championships
 1st Grand Prix d'Isbergues
 1st Stage 2 Rhône-Alpes Isère Tour
 2nd  Road race, UEC European Under-23 Road Championships
 6th Grand Prix de Plumelec-Morbihan
 6th Tour de Berne
2018
 3rd Paris–Tours
 9th Bretagne Classic
 9th Coppa Sabatini
 9th La Roue Tourangelle
 10th Cholet-Pays de Loire
2019
 1st  Overall Tour du Limousin
1st  Young rider classification
1st Stage 3
 1st Grand Prix de Plumelec-Morbihan
 1st Paris–Camembert
 1st Polynormande
 4th Tour de Vendée
 7th Bretagne Classic
 10th Grand Prix Cycliste de Québec
2020
 1st  Overall Étoile de Bessèges
 1st Grand Prix La Marseillaise
 1st Stage 4 Route d'Occitanie
 2nd La Flèche Wallonne
 2nd Paris–Tours
 3rd Brabantse Pijl
 5th La Drôme Classic
 10th Road race, UEC European Road Championships
 Tour de France
Held  after Stages 2–16
 Combativity award Stage 2
2021
 1st Bretagne Classic
 1st Tour du Finistère
 1st Tour du Jura
 2nd Polynormande 
 3rd  Road race, UEC European Road Championships
 4th Tre Valli Varesine
 8th Brabantse Pijl
2022
 1st Grand Prix Cycliste de Québec
 2nd Overall Circuit de la Sarthe
 2nd Overall Boucles de la Mayenne
 2nd Amstel Gold Race
 2nd Brabantse Pijl
 3rd La Drôme Classic
 5th Grand Prix La Marseillaise
 5th Tre Valli Varesine
 6th Overall Tour du Limousin
2023
 8th Trofeo Laigueglia

Grand Tour general classification results timeline

Classics results timeline

References

External links

1995 births
Living people
French male cyclists
People from Cherbourg-Octeville
Olympic cyclists of France
Cyclists at the 2020 Summer Olympics
Sportspeople from Manche
Cyclists from Normandy